Mohibullah Khan, often referred to by the nickname "Mo Khan", (2 December 1937 – 31 March 1994) was a squash player from Pakistan. He was one of the leading players in the game in the 1960s and a member of the famous Khan Dynasty of squash.  His biggest triumph was winning the British Open in 1963.

Life and career
Mo was the nephew of the two most dominant Pakistani squash players of the 1950s – the brothers Hashim Khan and Azam Khan.  He was also the nephew of Roshan Khan, winner of the British Open in 1957.  Roshan is the father of Jahangir Khan, regarded as the greatest squash player in history. During the 1950s and 1960s,  Mo and his uncles Hashim, Azam, and Roshan dominated the sport by capturing almost every major professional squash competition.

Mo finished runner-up at the British Open to his uncle Azam in 1959, 1961 and 1962. (The British Open was considered to be the effective world championship of the sport at the time.) He then won the British Open in 1963 in dramatic fashion. In the final against A.A. AbouTaleb of Egypt, he saved multiple match-points from 8-1 down in the fourth game as he came back to win in five games 9-4, 5-9, 3-9, 10-8, 9-6.  It would be his first and only British Open title.

In 1963, following his winning of the British Open, Mo secured the backing of United States President John F. Kennedy to move to the US and take up a position as a squash professional at the Harvard Club in Boston.  He spent most of the years following his move the States playing and teaching squash's North American (i.e. hardball) game. This he speedingly mastered to the point of being runner-up to his uncle Hashim in the 1963 North American Open, whose 1964, 1965, 1966, and 1968 editions (as well as five straight North American Pro events from 1965–69) Mohibullah would subsequently capture.

Though this change of both environment and emphasis would exact a price in the form of Mo's straight-set semi-final loss to Michael Oddy in the 1964 British Open, it was undoubtedly a smart career move for this volatile extrovert, whose exceptional shotmaking skills were perfectly tailored to the North American game. While the formidable records of both Hashim and Azam were predicated on solid error-free play and relentless retrieving, Mohibullah evinced a crowd-pleasing flair for the spectacular.

Another Pakistani squash player who was also named Mohibullah Khan emerged as one of the leading players in the game in the 1970s (see: Mohibullah Khan). To distinguish the pair, Mo is sometimes referred to as Mohibullah Khan "the elder" or Mohibullah Khan "senior". (The pair are not known to be directly related, but their families originate from the same village in the Peshawar region of northern Pakistan, so it is possible that 
they are distantly related.)

Mo died in 1994 at the age of 56 when he suddenly collapsed and died at the Harvard Club after giving a lesson that ended mere moments before.

British Open final appearances

See also
World Squash Doubles Championships

References

External links 
 The Khan Family, A Squash Dynasty Part II
 Pakistan Squash - The Khan Supremacy Part III

1937 births
1994 deaths
Khan family (squash)
Pakistani emigrants to the United States
Pakistani male squash players
Pashtun people